Paul Burani (born Urbain Roucoux; Paris, 26 March 1845 – Paris, 9 October 1901), was a French author, actor, songwriter and librettist.

He had a short career as an actor at the Théâtre de Belleville and in the French provinces, after which he directed a journal, Le Café-Concert. At the commencement of his career as a songwriter he used the name Burani, an anagram of his first name.

Works 
He collaborated on libretti for the following operas:
Le Droit du seigneur (with Maxime Boucheron), music by Léon Vasseur - 1878 
Le Billet de logement (with Boucheron), Vasseur - 1879 
 La Barbière improvisée (with Jules Montini), Joseph O'Kelly - 1882
Le Petit Parisien (with Boucheron), Vasseur - 1882 
François les bas-bleus (with Ernest Dubreuil and Eugène Humbert), André Messager - 1883
Le Mariage au tambour (after Alexandre Dumas), Vasseur - 1886 
Le roi malgré lui (with Emile de Najac), Emmanuel Chabrier - 1887
Ninon de Lenclos (with Blavet), Vasseur, 1887 
Le Puits qui parle (with Beaumont), Edmond Audran -  1888
Le Prince soleil (with Hippolyte Raymond), Vasseur - 1889
Le Commandant Laripete (with Silvestre, Valabrigue), Vasseur - 1892
Le Cabinet Piperlin (with Raymond), Hervé - 1897

Le Sire de Fisch Ton Kan was a popular song during the Paris Commune (1871), with words by Paul Burani and music by Antonin Louis, which denounced Napoléon III who was leading France to military disasters; the song contains many plays on words.

References

French opera librettists
1845 births
1901 deaths
French journalists
French male stage actors
Male actors from Paris
Writers from Paris
French male dramatists and playwrights
19th-century French dramatists and playwrights
19th-century French male writers
French male non-fiction writers